Ashley Gunstock (born ) is a British Green Party politician and actor. He unsuccessfully ran against Caroline Lucas to become the first leader of the Green Party in 2008 and was a candidate in the 2021 Green Party of England and Wales leadership election.

Acting career 
Gunstock played the role of Robin Frank in The Bill from 1984–1989. In 2016, he collaborated on a translation into English of the Dario Niccodemi play Scampolo. He played Shylock in his own adaptation of The Merchant of Venice in 2019.

Political career
Gunstock is a member of the Green Party of England and Wales. He was previously a member of the UK Green Party before it separated, running for the party in the 1990 Barnet London Borough Council election. He ran for the successor party in every London Borough Council election until 2014. He stood as the Green parliamentary election candidate in Finchley in 1992, Finchley and Golders Green in 1997 and in Leyton and Wanstead for every election since 2001.

He stood for the London Assembly for the Havering and Redbridge constituency in the 2000, 2004 and 2008 elections.

Leadership campaigns 
In 2007 Gunstock stood to be the male Principal Speaker of the Green Party, a public spokesperson role the party had instead of leaders until 2008. He came in third place with 9.1% of the vote. He was a candidate in the 2008 Green Party of England and Wales leadership election. Caroline Lucas, the other candidate, was considered much better-known in the party. She won the election by 2,559 votes to Gunstock's 210.

On 17 August 2021, Gunstock announced he was running in the party's 2021 leadership election. He said that he wanted to get more Green Party candidates elected in order to address climate change.

Elections contested

House of Commons

London Assembly (constituency)

Council

Green Party leadership

References

Green Party of England and Wales parliamentary candidates
Living people
Year of birth missing (living people)